Jessika Jenson (born August 7, 1991) is an American snowboarder born in Idaho Falls, Idaho She represented the United States at the 2014 Winter Olympics in Sochi and the 2018 Winter Olympics in PyeongChang, where she finished 5th in slopestyle and made the finals in big air.

References

External links
 Jessika Jenson at the International Ski Federation

1991 births
Living people
American female snowboarders
Snowboarders at the 2014 Winter Olympics
Snowboarders at the 2018 Winter Olympics
Olympic snowboarders of the United States
People from Idaho Falls, Idaho
21st-century American women